Censorship in Peru has been prevalent throughout its history. There have been multiple shifts in the level of freedom of the press in Peru, starting in the late 1900s when the country was oppressed, to the early 2000s when the country experienced more freedom; only recently has the country been ranked as partly free. More recently, censorship has been used in Peru to suppress those who dissent against Fujimorism and the Peruvian Armed Forces.

History

The period of military rule (1968–1980) 

Press freedom in Peru underwent its worst stage during the military regime, also known as the Peruvian Military Junta, led by Juan Velasco Alvarado in 1968 to 1980. The president implemented a new press law ordering the expropriation of all national newspapers in 1974. Newspapers were closed and publishers were accused of distorting their reports to influence the public, after which the publishers were sent into exile. Velasco expropriated the country's major newspapers, as well as the main television channels and radio stations. 

Print and broadcast media were subjected to censorship. Only media platforms that shared the regime's main aims, to align the means of communication with the social interest of Velasco, were allowed to operate. Velasco used government-appointed bureaucrats to look over the articles being published, such that the papers published resembled the military regime's principles. Hector Cornejo Chavez was one of the figures appointed to overlook El Comercio as he was one of Velasco's must trusted advisers.

Even though Velasco managed to hide opposing opinions on the regime coming from newspapers or mass media platforms, a few independent press organizations managed to survive throughout the late 1970s.

The Fujimori decade (1990–2000) 

Peru underwent an internal war characterised by the rise of Shining Path's guerrillas, and terrorist actions, which led Peru under military rule. Peruvian journalists continued to have problems of freedom of the press concerning economic instability and threats from the growing guerrilla movements. In the late 1980s, the Peruvian Armed Forces drafted plans that involved the genocide of impoverished and indigenous Peruvians, the control or censorship of media in the nation and the establishment of a neoliberal economy controlled by a military junta in Peru.

During his campaigning for the 1990 Peruvian general election, Alberto Fujimori expressed concern against the proposed neoliberal policies, though after taking office and being approached by the military, Fujimori abandoned the economic platform he promoted during his campaign, adopting more aggressive neoliberal policies than those espoused by his competitor in the election. Fujimori would go on to adopt many of the policies outlined in Plan Verde.

During the 1992 Peruvian self-coup led by Fujimori, troops occupied newspaper buildings, forcing journalists to show them news stories before these are published. These measures against newspapers, radio and television stations began at 10:30pm on 5 April 1992 and remained for forty hours until 7 April, limiting initial reporting on the coup from domestic media. Fujimori requested the troops to leave the buildings and visited El Comercio to apologize for their actions in the portrayal of their authoritative regime as a dictatorship, while also mentioning the existence of unrestricted press freedom in Peru. During the period, only the Fujimori government was granted to communicate with the public and all newspapers were printed under military observation and contained similar content; every publication was ordered to not include the word "coup". According to of Manuel D'Ornellas of Expreso in 1994, the military's oversight of the media was only momentary due to international condemnation Fujimori received.

Fujimori did not intervene directly since most media platforms agreed with his objectives, thus maintaining the regime's stability. Through the remainder of Fujimori's tenure, his government would pay media organizations for positive coverage and to assist with maintaining the presidency. Secret videos of Montesinos paying media executives were eventually released to the public, showing Fujimori's closest advisor giving them bundles of cash in exchange for support and the firing of critical journalists. Payoffs and promises of legal leniency were made to multiple chicha press tabloids, the newspaper Expreso and the television channels Global Television, Latina Televisión, América Televisión, and Panamericana Televisión.

Contemporary period (since 2000) 
After Fujimori's regime ended, Peru undertook efforts to restore democratic processes, and with these came initiatives to restore press freedom. In 2001, president Alejandro Toledo tried to eliminate corruption in order to restore press freedom in which the government introduced a law, which three years later allowed for the freedom of expression and of the press. In 2011, Peru passed a law that eradicated jail time for defamation and replaced it with fines and community service. However, in December 2012, public access to information about national security and defense was denied. A new cyber crime law that restricted access to government data was passed in October 2013. Laws that governed journalists' ability to gather data have changed over time and journalists continue to face difficulties in gathering information and publishing stories. Despite the existence of access-to-information laws, in practice official documents are not always made available to journalists.

In 2013, El Comercio Group acquired Empresa Periodistica Nacional SA (Epensa) in August 2013, resulting with the group owning 80% of the printed press in Peru. To some observers, the acquisition allowed El Comercio Group to limit press freedom by controlling opinions published in their newspapers, though El Comercio Group denied such allegations. President Ollanta Humala denounced the acquisition saying that the move gave the conglomerate too much influence and called on legislators to oversee the controversy.

Verbal attacks against press workers by politicians increased into the 2020s, with far-right groups in Peru being documented attacking journalists by Reporters Without Borders. During the 2021 Peruvian general election, the right-wing elite, business groups and the majority of media organizations in Peru collaborated with the campaign of Keiko Fujimori, the daughter of Alberto Fujimori, by appealing to fear when discussing political opponents. Some Peruvian broadcast television channels openly supported Fujimori's candidacy as well. Reuters wrote that El Comercio, one of the largest media organizations in South America, "generally backed Fujimori". Colombian journalist Clara Elvira Ospina of Grupo who was the journalistic director of La República's América Televisión and El Comercio's Canal N was removed from her position on 24 April 2021 after having served in the position for a total of nine years. One anonymous individual said that Ospina allegedly told Fujimori personally that the journalistic direction of the media organizations would not favor her or Castillo, instead using impartiality during their coverage. The Knight Center for Specialized Journalism wrote that Grupo La República shareholder Gustavo Mohme Seminario described the incident as self-censorship. Shortly after polls closed on 6 June 2021, the journalists of Cuarto Poder who sent a letter criticizing alleged censorship were fired by La República's América Televisión and El Comercio's Canal N.

Ranking of Peru's press freedom 

The 2018 World Press Freedom Index shows a slight overall improvement in respect for press freedom in Latin America. However, Latin American countries such as Peru still suffer recurring problems of violence, impunity and authoritarian policies towards citizens that work as journalists.

Peru occupies the 88th position of 180 listed countries all over the world when it comes to press freedom, with the lowest number in the ranking being the countries with more press freedom, according to the 2018 World Press Freedom Index. Peru also occupies the 6th position out of 12 countries in South America, according to the latest World Press Freedom Index 2018. Each index reflects the level of freedom available to journalists, as the researchers reported it is based on an evaluation of the independence of media, pluralism and the quality of legislative framework and safety of journalists in each country.

As the rankings show, Peru continues to have noticeable problems when talking about press freedom as media freedom is threatened by the press laws that allows for journalists to be punished with imprisonment, and for expanding news that can damage the reputation of a company, person or the government. Hence journalists must avoid topics such as corruption, social conflicts or drug trafficking.

Attacks, threats and murders against Peruvian journalists 
Journalists in Peru face various threats, with some journalists becoming victims of violent and deadly attacks.

See also 

 Freedom of speech by country
 Freedom of the press
 Human rights in Peru
 Internet censorship and surveillance by country
 List of newspapers in Peru
 Media of Peru
 Telecommunications in Peru
 Television in Peru
 World Press Freedom Index

References

Bibliography 

Peru
Communications in Peru
Human rights in Peru